Yttrium oxyfluoride is an inorganic chemical compound with the formula . Under normal conditions, the compound is a colorless solid.

Synthesis
The decomposition of crystalline hydrate of yttrium fluoride upon heating (900 °C) in a vacuum:
 

Hydrolysis of yttrium fluoride with superheated steam (800 °C):

Properties
Yttrium oxyfluoride forms colorless crystals of tetragonal crystal system; its cell parameters are: a = 0.3910 nm, c = 0.5431 nm. According to hexagonal crystal family, the cell parameters are: a = 0.38727 nm, c = 1.897 nm, Z = 6.

Applications
Stable yttrium oxyfluoride material is used for inner walls of plasma process equipment.

References

Yttrium compounds
Oxygen compounds
Fluorine compounds